-Kynurenine is a metabolite of the amino acid -tryptophan used in the production of niacin.

Kynurenine is synthesized by the enzyme tryptophan dioxygenase, which is made primarily but not exclusively in the liver, and indoleamine 2,3-dioxygenase, which is made in many tissues in response to immune activation. Kynurenine and its further breakdown products carry out diverse biological functions, including dilating blood vessels during inflammation and regulating the immune response. Some cancers increase kynurenine production, which increases tumor growth.

Evidence suggests that increased kynurenine production may precipitate depressive symptoms associated with interferon treatment for hepatitis C. Cognitive deficits in schizophrenia are associated with imbalances in the enzymes that break down kynurenine. Blood levels of kynurenine are reduced in people with bipolar disorder. Kynurenine production is increased in Alzheimer's disease and cardiovascular disease where its metabolites are associated with cognitive deficits and depressive symptoms. Kynurenine is also associated with tics.

Kynureninase catabolizes the conversion of kynurenine into anthranilic acid while kynurenine-oxoglutarate transaminase catabolizes its conversion into kynurenic acid. Kynurenine 3-hydroxylase converts kynurenine to 3-hydroxykynurenine.

Kynurenine has also been identified as one of two compounds that makes up the pigment that gives the goldenrod crab spider its yellow color.

Kynurenine pathway dysfunction 
Dysfunctional states of distinct steps of the kynurenine pathway (such as kynurenine, kynurenic acid, quinolinic acid, anthranilic acid, 3-hydroxykynurenine) have been described for a number of disorders, including:

HIV dementia
Tourette syndrome
Tic disorders
Psychiatric disorders (such as schizophrenia, bipolar disorder, major depression, anxiety disorders)
Multiple sclerosis
Huntington's disease
Encephalopathies
Lipid metabolism
Liver fat metabolism
Systemic lupus erythematosus
Glutaric aciduria
Vitamin B6 deficiency
Eosinophilia-myalgia syndrome
Myalgic encephalomyelitis / chronic fatigue syndrome

Downregulation of kynurenine-3-monooxygenase (KMO) can be caused by genetic polymorphisms, cytokines, or both. KMO deficiency leads to an accumulation of kynurenine and to a shift within the tryptophan metabolic pathway towards kynurenine acid and anthranilic acid. Kynurenine-3-monooxygenase deficiency is associated with disorders of the brain (e.g. major depressive disorder, bipolar disorder, schizophrenia, tic disorders)  and of the liver.

See also 
 Indoleamine 2,3-dioxygenase (IDO)
 Tryptophan 2,3-dioxygenase (TDO)
 N′-Formylkynurenine

References 

Amino acids
Human metabolites
NMDA receptor antagonists